This is a list of United States Air Force special tactics squadrons. It covers special operations forces units assigned to Air Force Special Operations Command in the United States Air Force.

Special Tactics Squadrons consist of Special Tactics Officers, Combat Controllers, Combat Rescue Officers, Pararescuemen, Special Reconnaissance, Tactical Air Control Party operators, and a number of combat support airmen which comprise 58 Air Force specialties.

Special Tactics Squadrons

See also
 List of United States Air Force squadrons
 List of United States Air Force special operations squadrons

References

External links

Special operations
Special tactics squadrons of the United States Air Force
Air force special forces units